The Alfred Hanson House, also known as the Hanson/McCarthy House, is a historic building located in Oelwein, Iowa, United States. Alfred Hanson was an Oelwein native who was engaged in farming before he moved back to town and became a banker.  He had this house built in 1904.  The two-story, frame Colonial Revival was designed by Harry E. Netcott of the Independence, Iowa architectural firm of Netcott & Donnan.  Its distinctive features include a two-thirds recessed sun porch that was enclosed in 1957, a Palladian window, and an open Portico on the main facade.  It was listed on the National Register of Historic Places in 1984.

References

Houses completed in 1904
Colonial Revival architecture in Iowa
Houses in Fayette County, Iowa
National Register of Historic Places in Fayette County, Iowa
Houses on the National Register of Historic Places in Iowa